Dolores Gaos González-Pola (2 December 1921, in Valencia – 4 July 1993, in Madrid), better known as Lola Gaos, was a Spanish film, television and theatre actress.

Famous with her works with Luis Buñuel but specially the film Furtivos where she played the dominant mother.

Selected filmography

 El sotano (1949)
 Esa pareja feliz (1953) - Reina en Rodaje
 El candelabro (1956, Short)
 Susana y yo (1957) - Estudiante #2
 Un marido de ida y vuelta (1957) - Lola
 Moloka (1959) - (uncredited)
 Un ángel tuvo la culpa (1959) - Chantajista
 Alma aragonesa (1961) - Antonia
 Viridiana (1961) - Enedina
 Prohibido enamorarse (1961) - Justina
 Tres de la Cruz Roja (1961) - Madre de Tere
 Los pedigüeños  (1961)
 Salto mortal (1962)
 Atraco a las tres (1962) - Hermana de Fernando Galindo (uncredited)
 Las cuatro verdades (1962)
 Rogelia (1962) - Mendiga
 Millonario por un día (1963) - Carmen
 El Verdugo (1963) - Mujer visitante de la obra nº 3
 Benigno, hermano mío (1963)
 A este lado del muro (1963, Short)
 Confidencias de un marido (1963)
 Se vive una vez (1963)
 Tiempo de amor (1964) - Gitana
 La Tía Tula (1964) - (uncredited)
 Los dinamiteros (1964) - María
 Anabel (1964, Short)
 El diablo también llora (1965)
 El arte de vivir (1965) - Madre de Luis
 El sonido de la muerte (1966) - Calliope
 La busca (1966) - Petra
 El precio de un hombre (1966) - Ruth Harmon
 Tres perros locos, locos, locos (1966)
 Residencia para espías (1966) - Omar's Wife
 A la memoria del autor (1966, Short) - (voice)
 Los chicos con las chicas (1967) - Doña Arsenia
 Madame Arthur (1967, Short)
 Tristana (1970) - Saturna
 Growing Leg, Diminishing Skirt (1970) - Doña Úrsula
 Préstame quince días (1971) - Flora
 Nicholas e Alexandra (1971)
 My Dear Killer (1972) - Adele Rudigiani
 Mi querida señorita (1972) - Tía Chus
 Marianela (1972) - La Señana
 Pancho Villa (1972) - Old Woman
 The Guerrilla (1973) - Aldeana
 Ceremonia sangrienta (1973) - Carmilla
 Sex o no sex (1974) - Tía de Angélica
 Furtivos (1975) - Martina
 De profesión: polígamo (1975) - Madre de María
 El poder del deseo (1975) - Madre de Javier
 Caperucita y roja (1977) - Farmacéutica
 Dios bendiga cada rincón de esta casa (1977) - Sagrario
 Sonámbulos (1978) - Fátima
 La isla de las cabezas (1978)
 Elisita (1980) - Dona Elisa
 Tu estas loco, Briones (1980) - Sor Piedad
 Trágala, perro (1981) - Madre Superiora
 El lago de las vírgenes (1982) - The virgins' mother
 Latidos de pánico (1983) - Mabile
 El Balcón abierto (1984) - La Poncia
 Caso cerrado (1984) - Funcionaria Prisión
 Hierro dulce (1985)
 La noche de la ira (1986) - Enriqueta
 Gran sol (1989) - (final film role)

External links

1921 births
1993 deaths
People from Valencia
Spanish film actresses
Spanish television actresses
Spanish stage actresses
20th-century Spanish actresses
Deaths from cancer in Spain
Deaths from colorectal cancer